The PCSO Bingo Milyonaryo Puffins were a professional volleyball team that played in the women's division of the Philippine Super Liga (PSL). The team was owned by the Philippine Charity Sweepstakes Office (PCSO) and was one of the six pioneer teams in the PSL. It disbanded after the inaugural tournament.

Roster
For the 2013 PSL Invitational Conference:

Coaching staff
 Head Coach: Ronald Dulay
 Assistant Coach(s): 

Team Staff
 Team Manager: 
 Team Utility: 

Medical Staff
 Team Physician: 
 Physical Therapist:

Honors

Team

References

Philippine Super Liga
2013 establishments in the Philippines
Volleyball clubs established in 2013
Volleyball clubs disestablished in 2013
Women's volleyball teams in the Philippines